The International Whisky Competition is an event that takes place annually in Chicago in which whiskies are blind tasted and rated by a professional tasting panel. The results are used to produce tasting notes for an International Whisky Guide.

History
The International Whisky Competition was founded in 2009 by Sylvain Allard and Michael Petrucci. In 2016 the results began being used to produce an International Whisky Guide.

Event
There are up to 60 categories depending on the whisky type, with gold, silver, and bronze awards for each. Whiskies are sampled individually and judges are given 5 minutes to blind taste, judge, and score each whisky.
A 100 point scoring system is used which was adapted from the wine industry. The rating system uses the following four criteria:
 Sight
 Colors (0 points)
 Visual appeal (5 points)
 Nose
 Intensity and complexity (15 points)
 Distinctiveness of aromas (10 points)
 Balance of aromas (10 points)
 Taste-Mouth Feel
 Palate and balance (10 points)
 Alcohol, body and complexity (10 points)
 Distinctiveness of flavors (10 points)
 Balance between flavors (10 points)
 Finish
 Length and finish (10 points)
 Quality of finish (10 points)

Awards given in the competition 
  Whisky of the Year 
  Master Distiller/Blender of the Year
  Distillery of the Year
  Best Blended Whisky (All Categories)
  Best New Release
  Best Single Malt Whisk(e)y
  Best Rye Whiskey
  Best World Whisk(e)y
  Best Peated Whisk(e)y
  Best Grain Whisk(e)y
  Best Value Whisk(e)y (for whiskies under $30)
  Brand Ambassador of the Year
  Blogger of the Year
  Best Flavored Whisk(e)y
  8 Country and continent awards
  15 Scotch whisky awards
  4 Irish whiskey awards
  19 United States whiskey awards

The complete list can be seen on the competition website.

Judges
The present panel consists of ten experts. In 2014, Michael Petrucci stepped down from the competition, and in 2015 Sebastien Gavillet took over as head of the tasting panel, restructuring the competition and implemented a new tasting methodology. Starting in 2016, entry samples began being archived for referencing.

External links
  International Whisky Competition
  Results 2017

References

Whisky
Alcoholic drinks
Food and drink awards